Enarthromyces is a genus of fungi in the family Laboulbeniaceae. This is a monotypic genus, containing the single species Enarthromyces indicus.

References

External links
Enarthromyces at Index Fungorum

Laboulbeniomycetes
Monotypic Laboulbeniomycetes genera